Honduras competed at the 2012 Summer Olympics in London, United Kingdom, from 27 July to 12 August 2012. This was the nation's tenth appearance at the Olympics, excluding the 1972 Summer Olympics in Munich, and the 1980 Summer Olympics in Moscow, because of the American-led boycott.

Comité Olímpico Hondureño sent the nation's largest delegation to the Games, surpassing the record by just two athletes short from Beijing. A total of 27 athletes, 24 men and 3 women, competed in 8 sports. Most of them qualified in men's football, the nation's only team sport at these Olympic games. The Honduran athletes also featured two hurdlers, Jeimy Bernárdez, who competed at her second consecutive Olympics, and Ronald Bennett, who became the nation's flag bearer at the opening ceremony. Among the sports played by the athletes, Honduras marked its Olympic debut in shooting, specifically in the women's pistol event. Honduras, however, has yet to win its first Olympic medal.

Athletics

Men

Women

Boxing

Honduras has had 1 boxer invited

Men

Football

Honduras has qualified for the men's event.
 Men's team event – 1 team of 18 players.

Men's tournament

Team roster

Group play

Quarter-final

Judo

Honduras has had 1 judoka invited.

Shooting

Women

Swimming

Men

Women

Weightlifting

Wrestling

Honduras has qualified one quota.

Men's freestyle

References

Nations at the 2012 Summer Olympics
2012
Summer Olympics